Chydorus is a genus of Chydoridae.

The genus was described in 1816 by William Elford Leach.

It has cosmopolitan distribution.

It was found that centers of dispersion of two Chydorus groups were located in the European part of the continent and two others in Asia. One clade survived during harsh conditions of the Pleistocene glaciation in a northern refugium, while another clade survived in the south.

Species include:
 Chydorus gibbus
 Chydorus globosus
 Chydorus latus
 Chydorus ovalis
 Chydorus piger
 Chydorus rylovi Mukhamediev, 1963
 Chydorus sinensis Frey, 1987
 Chydorus sphaericus (O.F. Müller, 1776)

References

Cladocera